Landgraaf is a railway station in Landgraaf, Netherlands, situated near the district Schaesberg. Before 1986, it was called Schaesberg. The station was opened on 1 May 1896 and is located on the Sittard–Herzogenrath railway and the Heuvellandlijn (Maastricht–Kerkrade). Services are operated by Arriva and Deutsche Bahn.

Train services
The following train services call at this station:
Express : Aachen–Maastricht
Local Stoptrein: Sittard–Heerlen–Kerkrade

External links
NS website 
Dutch public transport travel planner 

Railway stations in Limburg (Netherlands)
Railway stations opened in 1896
Railway stations on the Heuvellandlijn
Landgraaf